Lenwade railway station was a railway station in North Norfolk, England. It was built by the Lynn and Fakenham Railway Company in 1882 and taken over by the Midland and Great Northern Joint Railway (M&GNJR) in 1893, to serve the small hamlet of Lenwade. Despite the settlement's size, the railway provided a direct service to Norwich and King's Lynn. It closed to passengers in 1959, but remained open to goods trains until 1983.

The station is now on the route of Marriott's Way. The station is now a private residence and has been fully restored.

References

External links
 Lenwade station on navigable 1946 O. S. map

Disused railway stations in Norfolk
Railway stations in Great Britain opened in 1882
Railway stations in Great Britain closed in 1959
Former Midland and Great Northern Joint Railway stations
Great Witchingham